John Langwith may refer to:
 John Langwith Sr., English carpenter and architect
 John Langwith Jr., his son, English architect and builder